An expansion pack, expansion set, supplement, or simply expansion is an addition to an existing role-playing game, tabletop game, video game or collectible card game. These add-ons usually add new game areas, weapons, objects, characters, adventures or an extended storyline to an already-released game.

While board game expansions are typically designed by the original creator, video game developers sometimes contract out development of the expansion pack to a third-party company, it may choose to develop the expansion itself, or it may do both.

Board games and tabletop RPGs may have been marketing expansions since the 1970s, and video games have been releasing expansion packs since the 1980s, early examples being the Dragon Slayer games Xanadu Scenario II and Sorcerian. Other terms for the concept are module and, in certain games' marketing, adventure.

Characteristics
The price of an expansion pack is usually much less than that of the original game. As expansion packs consist solely of additional content, most require the original game in order to play. Games with many expansions often begin selling the original game with prior expansions, such as The Sims Deluxe Edition (The Sims with The Sims: Livin' Large). These bundles make the game more accessible to new players. When games reach the end of their lifespan, the publisher often releases a 'complete' or 'gold' collection, which includes the game and all its subsequent expansions.

Stand-alone expansion packs
Some expansion packs do not require the original game in order to use the new content, as is the case with Half-Life: Blue Shift, Uncharted: The Lost Legacy or Sonic & Knuckles. Some art, sound, and code are reused from the original game.  In some cases, a stand-alone expansion such as Heroes of Might and Magic III: The Shadow of Death, or Dungeon Siege: Legends of Aranna includes the original game.

Console game expansion packs
Expansion packs are most commonly released for PC games, but are becoming increasingly prevalent for video game consoles, particularly due to the popularity of downloadable content. The increasing number of multi-platform games has also led to the release of more expansion packs on consoles, especially stand-alone expansion packs (as described above).  Command & Conquer 3: Kane's Wrath, for example, requires the original Command & Conquer 3: Tiberium Wars to play on the PC, but Xbox 360 versions of both the original Tiberium Wars and Kane's Wrath are available, neither of which require one another.

Grand Theft Auto: London 1969 was the first expansion pack released for the PlayStation. The game required the player to insert the London disc, remove it, insert the original Grand Theft Auto disc, remove it, then insert the London media again in order to play.

Sonic & Knuckles for the Mega Drive/Genesis was unusual in that it functioned as both a stand-alone cartridge and as an expansion pack for both Sonic the Hedgehog 2 and Sonic the Hedgehog 3.

Collectible card game expansions
Collectible card games, or CCGs for short, are typically released as expansion sets, composed of booster packs. CCGs may be referred to as "living" or "dead", and living CCGs are routinely published with supplementary expansions. CCGs generally don't have a core set that is reprinted indefinitely, instead, they are retired and replaced with new expansions on a quarterly or bi-annual basis. Expansions usually introduce new rules, or game mechanics, expanding the games library of cards and rules set.

See also
 Episodic video game
 Special edition
 Mod (video games)
 Downloadable Content (DLC)

References

 
Video game development
Video game distribution
Video game terminology